Florence Crawford (April 7, 1880, Pittsburgh, Pennsylvania - March 15, 1954, Los Angeles) was an American silent film actress.

Filmography
The Scarlet West (1925) .... Mrs. Harper
The Path of Happiness (1916) .... Doris Ingraham
The Man Inside (1916) .... Yvette Deplau
Driven by Fate (1915)
Copper (1915)
Buried Treasure (1915)
The Job and the Jewels (1915)
The Little Mother (1915/II)
Her Buried Past (1915) .... Mrs. Madison
Your Baby and Mine (1915)
The Deputy's Chance That Won (1915)
The Beast Within (1915) .... Mamie Rose
The Express Messenger (1915)
After Twenty Years (1915)
The Terror of the Mountains (1915)
A Lucky Disappointment (1914)
Bill and Ethel at the Ball(1914)
The Forest Thieves (1914)
They Never Knew (1914)
The Hidden Message (1914)
The Miner's Peril (1914)
Out of the Deputy's Hands (1914)
Bad Man Mason (1914)
The Tardy Cannon Ball (1914)
Where the Mountains Meet (1914)
The High Grader (1914)
The Miner's Baby (1914)
The Stolen Oar (1914)
The Sheriff's Prisoner (1914)
How Bill Squared It for His Boss (1914) (as Miss Crawford)
A Pair of Cuffs (1914)
His Punishment (1914/I)
It's a Bear! (1914)
The Thief and the Book (1914)
Sorority Initiation (1914)
The Lady Killer (1913)

References

External links
 
  Florence Crawford on cover of Reel Life magazine; Jan. 1915(archived)

American film actresses
Actresses from Pittsburgh
American silent film actresses
1880 births
1954 deaths
20th-century American actresses